Orient, Oregon, is an unincorporated community in Multnomah County, Oregon, United States. The community is centered at SE Orient Drive at 302nd Avenue, near Gresham, which is the rough location of the former Orient Post Office.

The area was home to the Orient Mill, a steam-driven sawmill founded by Andrew MacKinnon, an 1880 Scottish immigrant. MacKinnon's wife, Miyo Iwakoshi, was the first Japanese citizen to settle in Oregon.

Demographics

References

External links
Information on Orient, Oregon from RoadsideThoughts

Unincorporated communities in Multnomah County, Oregon
Unincorporated communities in Oregon